Coat of arms of Ivano-Frankivsk is an official symbol of the Ivano-Frankivsk city. The current one was adopted on February 17, 1995.

Former coat of arms

The Polish city emblem was adopted at a session of the city council on March 10, 1938, and published on May 24, 1938. It was composed of a modern French escutcheon, in the middle of which was a big white three tower castles with open front city gates. Inside the gate is the Piława coat of arms, Potocki family symbol.

References

Further reading
 Ryszard Tymoteusz Komorowski: "Ilustrowany przewodnik heraldyczny". Bellona. Warszawa 2007.  
 Leszek Pudłowski: "Heraldyka miejska II Rzeczypospolitej" in "Polskie tradycje samorządowe a heraldyka".  Lublin 1992.

External links
 Frankivsk.future.com.ua: Символи Франківська Frankivsk Future: Diana Kravets 5 September 2021 

Ivano-Frankivsk
Ivano-Frankivsk

Ivano-Frankivsk
Ivano-Frankivsk
Ivano-Frankivsk
Ivano-Frankivsk